Lazier is a surname. Notable people with the surname include:

 Bob Lazier (1938–2020), American racecar driver
 Buddy Lazier (born 1967), American racecar driver
 Gian Antonio Lazier (1678–1738), Italian impostor
 Jaques Lazier (born 1971), American racecar driver, brother of Buddy and son of Bob